John C. Paynter (born 15 May 1960) is a former Australian rules footballer who played for Sturt and Glenelg in the South Australian National Football League (SANFL) from 1980 to 1992.

After initially starting his career at Glenelg, Paynter shifted to Sturt in 1983 where he would win the best and fairest in his first season and would win three more over the course of 248 games for that club.  He was club captain for his final two seasons (1991–1992).  In 2015, Paynter was inducted into the South Australian Football Hall of Fame.

Paynter currently coaches the Modbury Football Club in Division 1 of the Channel 9 Adelaide Football League.

References

External links 

Living people
Sturt Football Club players
Glenelg Football Club players
Australian rules footballers from South Australia
1960 births
South Australian Football Hall of Fame inductees